Canby is an unincorporated community in Adair County, in the U.S. state of Iowa.

History
A post office called Canby was established in 1873, and remained in operation until 1908. A Quaker church once stood near the town site. Canby's population was 13 in 1902, and 25 in 1925.

Little remains of the original community.

References

Unincorporated communities in Adair County, Iowa
Unincorporated communities in Iowa